Donna Swajeski is an American writer known for her work on television soap operas.  She has been a head writer, a co-head writer and a breakdown writer on award-winning daytime dramas for NBC Daytime, ABC Daytime and CBS Daytime.  Before beginning her writing career on daytime dramas, she was Director of the East Coast Daytime Programs for NBC.

Awards and nominations
As co-head writer for Guiding Light, Swajeski and her team won the 2007 Daytime Emmy Award for Outstanding Writing.  The show was also recognized as the 2007 Daytime Emmy winner for Outstanding Drama Series. She is also a winner of a Writers Guild of America Award for best Daytime writing, also for Guiding Light.  She is currently working with children at the Delaware Children's Theater. She is a director, producer and actress.

Daytime Emmy Awards

WINS 
(2007; Best Writing; Guiding Light)

NOMINATIONS 
(1989; Best Writing; Another World)
(1999, 2005 & 2008; Best Writing; Guiding Light)
(2012; Best Writing; All My Children)

Writers Guild of America Award

WINS
(2005 season; Guiding Light)

NOMINATIONS 
(1999 & 2007 seasons; Guiding Light)
(2012 season; All My Children)

Positions held
All My Children 
 Program Executive: 1980s
Co-Head Writer (with David Kreizman): March 15, 2010 – April 1, 2011

Another World
Head writer: November 1988 - November 1992

The Bold and the Beautiful (hired by Bradley Bell)
Script writer: September 24, 2009 - March 2010

Guiding Light
Associate head writer: 1999 - 2001, March 2004 - 2009
Co-head writer: September 2003 - March 2004, 2005 - February 29, 2008, April 14, 2008 - August 21, 2008

Port Charles
Screenwriter: 2001 - 2003

HW History

Personal life
Swajeski lives in Arden, Delaware with her husband, radio talk show host Mike Opelka.

References

External links
 

American women television writers
American soap opera writers
Living people
Year of birth missing (living people)
Place of birth missing (living people)
Women soap opera writers
Daytime Emmy Award winners
Writers Guild of America Award winners
21st-century American women